The  is an electric multiple unit (EMU) train type operated Tokyo Metro on the Hanzomon Line in Japan. Introduced into service on 7 August 2021, a total of 19 ten-car trainsets are being manufactured by Hitachi Rail from 2020 to replace the aging Tokyo Metro 8000 series currently in service on the Hanzomon Line.

Formations

The 18000 series fleet is formed as follows:

Key 
 VVVF: Variable-voltage/variable-frequency drive
 SIV: Static inverter
 CP: Compressor
 BT: Battery

Interior
Passenger accommodation consists of longitudinal bench seating throughout. Wheelchair and stroller spaces are provided in all cars. The interior also includes security cameras.

History
In March 2019, Tokyo Metro announced a plan to introduce new rolling stock, including the 18000 series. The 18000 series are planned to replace the 8000 series, which have been in service since 1981.

Delivery of the first set began in October 2020. A second set was delivered from Hitachi Kasado plant in December 2020.

The trains entered full revenue service on 7 August 2021.

On 20 October 2021, the train type received the Good Design Award.

On 26 May 2022, the 18000 series, alongside the similar 17000 series, was awarded the Laurel Prize.

References

External links

Tokyo Metro news release 

Electric multiple units of Japan
18000 series
Hitachi multiple units
Train-related introductions in 2021
1500 V DC multiple units of Japan